Chonburi is the capital of Chonburi Province, Thailand.

Chonburi may also refer to:
Chonburi province, a province of Thailand
Mueang Chonburi district, the capital district of the province
Chonburi F.C., a Thai professional football club based in the city of Chonburi
Chonburi Stadium, a multi-use stadium in Chonburi Province, Thailand

See also
CentralPlaza Chonburi, a shopping and entertainment complex